A Time for Champions is a 2009 documentary film produced by  Bud Greenspan's Cappy Productions and St. Louis PBS member station KETC. It chronicles the Saint Louis University soccer dynasty of the 1960s and 1970s. It includes interviews with 1950 FIFA World Cup team members Frank Borghi, Harry Keough, and Walter Bahr, as well as Bob Costas and St. Louis native Yogi Berra.

The Film 
The film, distributed by American Public Television, was broadcast nationally on many PBS member stations. The broadcast coincided with the 50 year anniversary of St. Louis University soccer. The film also mentions the United States’ spectacular FIFA World Cup win over England on June 29, 1950, considered one of the greatest upsets in sports history.

Throughout the 20th century the United States remained an underdog in World Cup soccer. The losing streak ended in 1950 when a U.S. team featuring five St. Louisans on the 11- player roster beat England's powerhouse team 1–0 in a spectacular, surprise victory in Belo Horizonte, Brazil. That win signaled St. Louis’ rise as a soccer hotbed, a view reinforced nine years later when soccer became an intercollegiate sport. Between 1959 and 1973, Saint Louis University's soccer team, comprised almost exclusively of St. Louis players, won 10 of 15 NCAA Division I soccer championships.

A Time for Champions tells soccer's St. Louis story through archival photos, footage of games and players, and interviews with baseball legend Yogi Berra, sportscaster Bob Costas, U.S. Soccer Federation CEO Dan Flynn, Michigan State coach Joe Baum, former Indiana University coach Jerry Yeagley, former Catholic Youth League leader 90-year-old Monsignor Louis Meyer, Bill McDermott, former ESPN soccer commentator and 1950 World Cup team members Frank Borghi, Harry Keough and Walter Bahr.

References

External links
 Official website

2009 television films
2009 films
2009 documentary films
Documentary films about association football
Saint Louis Billikens men's soccer
Sports in St. Louis
Films set in St. Louis
Films shot in St. Louis